Smithfield was one of the most important locations for public executions in the medieval and modern City of London. The following people were among those executed there.

Traitors 
People charged with and convicted of treason (or high treason):

 William Wallace (23 August 1305)
 Wat Tyler (1381)
 Sir John Bulmer (1537)
 Edward Arden (1583), beheaded; his head put on London Bridge and his body quartered and placed on the city's gates

Heretics 

People charged with and convicted of heresy:
 William Sawtrey (1401)
 John Badby (1410)
 Thomas Bagley (1431)
 Richard Bayfield (1531)
 John Tewkesbury (1531)
 James Bainham (1532)
 John Frith (1533)
 Andrew Hewet (1533)
 John Lambert (1538)
 John Forrest (1538)
 Two Dutch Anabaptists, a man and a woman  (1538)
 William Collins (1540)
 Robert Barnes (1540)
 Thomas Gerrard (1540)
 William Jerome (1540) 
 Richard Fetherston (1540)
 Edward Powell (1540)
 Thomas Abel (1540)
 Anne Askew (1546)
 Nicholas Belenian (1546)
 John Adams (1546)
 John Lascelles(1546)
 Joan Bocher (1550)
 John Rogers (1555)
 Thomas Tomkins (1555)
 John Cardmaker (1555)
 John Warne (1555)
 John Bradford (1555)
 John Leaf (1555)
 John Philpot (1555)
 Thomas Whittle (1556)
 Bartholomew Green (1556)
 Thomas Brown (1556)
 John Tudson (1556)
 John Went (1556)
 Isobella Forster (1556)
 Joan Lushford (1556)
 William Tyms, burnt 24 April (1556)
 Robert Drake, burnt 24 April (1556)
 Richard Spurge, burnt 24 April (1556)
 Thomas Spurge, burnt 24 April (1556)
 George Ambrose, burnt 24 April (1556)
 John Cavel, burnt 24 April (1556)
 John Rough (1557)
 Robert Southain (1558)
 Roger Holland (1558)
 Nicholas Horner (1590)
 Bartholomew Legate (1612)

References 

Smithfield
People executed by the Kingdom of England
Smithfield, London